Ted Taplin was an Australian rugby league footballer who played in the 1910s and 1920s. He played in the NSWRFL premiership for North Sydney as a fullback.

Playing career
Taplin began his first grade career in 1912 and was a member of the North Sydney side which won their maiden premiership in 1921.  

Taplin played on in 1922 but only made 4 appearances and was not included in the 1922 grand final winning side.  Taplin also played representative football for New South Wales on 3 occasions and represented Tamworth and Orange in country rugby league.

References

North Sydney Bears players
Rugby league fullbacks
Year of death missing
Year of birth missing
Rugby league players from Sydney